Witchcraft is the second studio album released by Norwegian black metal band Obtained Enslavement, succeeding their 1994 debut album, Centuries of Sorrow. The album was released in 1997 after being recorded in 1996 at Grieghallen Studio in Bergen. The album was co-produced by Pytten and Obtained Enslavement.

The album notably incorporates a greater degree of symphonic elements in contrast to the band's debut.

Track listing

Line-Up 

Pest - vocals
Døden - guitars
Heks - guitars, keyboards
Tortur - bass guitar
Torquemada - drums, timpani
Pytten - producer

References

External links 
 Witchcraft at AllMusic

1997 albums
Obtained Enslavement albums